Eclogue 4, also known as the Fourth Eclogue, is the name of a Latin poem by the Roman poet Virgil.

Part of his first major work, the Eclogues, the piece was written around 42 BC, during a time of temporary stability following the Treaty of Brundisium; it was later published in and around the years 39–38 BC. The work describes the birth of a boy, a supposed savior, who—once he is of age—will become divine and eventually rule over the world. The exact meaning of the poem is still debated. Earlier interpretations argued that the child was the hoped-for offspring of Marc Antony and Octavia the Younger. Modern interpretations tend to shy away from imagining the child as a specific person. Edwin Floyd, for example, argued that the child could be seen metaphorically as Virgil's poetry.

In late antiquity and the Middle Ages, the poem was reinterpreted by Christians to be about the birth of Jesus Christ.  Medieval scholars thus claimed that Virgil had predicted Christ prior to his birth, and therefore must have been a pre-Christian prophet. Notable individuals such as Constantine the Great, St. Augustine, Dante Alighieri, and Alexander Pope believed in this interpretation of the eclogue. Modern scholars by and large shy away from this interpretation, although Floyd does note that the poem contains elements of religious and mythological themes, and R. G. M. Nisbet concluded that it is likely that Virgil was indirectly inspired by the Hebrew Scriptures via Eastern oracles.

Overview

Background

The biographical tradition asserts that Virgil began the hexameter Eclogues (or Bucolics) in 42 BC and it is thought that the collection was published around 39–38 BC, although this is controversial. The Eclogues (from the Greek word for "selections") are a group of ten poems roughly modeled on the bucolic hexameters ("pastoral poetry") of the Hellenistic poet Theocritus. The fourth of these Eclogues can be dated to around 41 to 40 BC, during a time "when the clouds of civil war seemed to be lifting".

Synopsis

The 63-line poem (the shortest of the Eclogues) begins with an address to the Muses. The first few lines have been referred to as the "apology" of the poem; the work, much like Eclogue 6, is not so much concerned with pastoral themes, as it is with cosmological concepts, and lines 1–3 defend this change of pace. In line 4, the speaker references the Cumaean Sibyl, claiming it as a source for his unfolding prophecy concerning the magnus ordo saeclorum, or "great order of the ages". The following lines (ll. 5–10) reference a myriad grouping of ideas: Hesiod's Ages of Man; the concept of a magnus annus, or the "Great Year" that begins a great age; the Italian idea of saecula; Plato's idea that there is a periodic rule of Saturn; and finally "eastern messianic" views similar to those found in the Sibylline Oracles, a collection of supposed oracular utterances written in Greek hexameters ascribed to the prophetesses who uttered divine revelations in a frenzied state.

Line 10 concludes with a reference to the god Apollo, a deity who would be elevated to a special place in the Roman pantheon during the rule of Augustus: tuus iam regnat Apollo ("Your Apollo now is ruling"). John Miller cautions, however, that this mention of Apollo—while the god's first "saecular  appearance" in Latin literature—should not be read unequivocally as a reference of Octavian, because  40 BC, both Octavian and Marc Antony were associated with the god, and that the former did not, at the time, enjoy "a monopoly on Apolline symbolism." R. G. M. Nisbet argued that the rule of Apollo (regnat Apollo) mentioned in line 10 should not be seen as contradicting the rule of Saturn (Saturnia regna) referenced in line 6; they are merely expressing the same general idea using two different cosmological outlooks. The former is adhering to a newer, non-Hesiodic model, whereas the latter is referring to the older, Hesiodic version.

Both lines 11 and 13–14 reference Gaius Asinius Pollio's leadership, but line 11 refers to his consulship at the time of the poem's writing, whereas lines 13–14 seem to reference a time when Pollio will "still be alive and prominent in the State when the child is well-grown" and when the Golden Age will have arrived. Lines 15–17 reveal that the child will become divine and eventually rule over the world. Lines 18–45 provide coverage of the boy's growth. At first, the child, in the cradle, will be allowed to enjoy munuscula, or little gifts. Importantly, the boy will grow skilled in reading, learning of the deeds of both heroes and his father. At this point in his life, the Golden Age will not have arrived in full; there will still be both sailing and walled towns, and thus, still war. Jenny Strauss Clay noted that the poem implies that the whole Heroic Age will have to be replayed; a new band of Argonauts will travel the seas, and a new Trojan War will occur. Given time, the need for sailing will dissipate. Then, the ground will grow more fertile: grapes will grow from brambles, oak trees will produce honey, corn will emerge from the ground by itself, poisonous plants and animals will disappear, and useful animals will be improved. Only when the need for agriculture ends will the Golden Age begin.

Lines 53–57 feature the image of a singing poet, which is reminiscent of how the eclogue began. The poet himself will compete in a rustic environment against Orpheus and Linus, and Pan will be the judge. Virgil's reference to Linus in this section symbolizes "the symbiosis of Hesiodic song culture and erudite, 'bookish' poetics of the so-called Alexandrian poets", resulting in a "uniquely Virgilian pastoral aesthetic." Once the Golden Age will have arrived, the need for arms and soldiers will be obviated, and the competitive drive that—in the past—had fueled war will now fuel "harmless [poetic] competition for rustic prizes." Lines 60–61 address the birth of the supposed savior, featuring the poet speaking directly to the child; he urges the baby to smile at his mother, since she had just borne him. Lines 60–63 have proven throughout the ages to be a "fascinating problem", and there is no clear consensus as to what exactly they mean. Nisbet claims that the final line is most likely a reference to a story about Hercules, who dined with Jupiter and took Juventas as his wife, although he noted it could also be a reference to a general Roman nursery saying.

Interpretation

Meaning

Grammarian and ancient Virgilian commentator, Maurus Servius Honoratus was one of the first to publish an interpretation of the poem, arguing that the entire work is a political allegory referring to the rule of the Princeps, although Miller points out that this is unlikely since the poem was written in 40 BC, prior to Octavian becoming Augustus.

For many years, a popular method in interpreting the poem was to see it as a cypher: many scholars attempted to deduce who exactly the child and his parents were. Some have proposed that the boy was supposed to be one of the sons of Pollio. A politician and patron of Virgil, Pollio was the father of two boys around the time of the Fourth Eclogue. The former died while in infancy, whereas the latter, Gaius Asinius Gallus Saloninus, died under the rule of Tiberius. Other scholars, however, felt that the child was more likely intended to be the male offspring of Marc Antony and Octavia the Younger. Wendell Clausen, for instance, posited that the word pacatum in line 17 is a reference to Hercules, a deity from whom Marc Antony claimed descent; this word, therefore, was used by Clausen as evidence that the poem was talking about a child of Antonian (and therefore, Herculean) descent. Interpreting the poem in this manner, however, has largely started to fall out of favor with modern scholars because, according to Bruce Arnold, "such interpretations usually rely either on broad considerations of genre or an analysis of small bits".

The poem has also been interpreted in more metaphorical ways. Some modern scholars are inclined to believe that the poem celebrates the Treaty of Brundisium, from which sprung forth the Second Triumvirate of Octavian, Marc Antony, and Marcus Aemilius Lepidus.. Floyd, on the other hand, proposed that the puer mentioned throughout the poem is not an actual child, but rather Virgilian poetry itself. He noted that the word puer is elsewhere used by Virgil in the Eclogues to refer to shepherds, individuals who are closely associated with the art of poetry. Furthermore, he points out that the verb incipere, which is used three times in Eclogue 4, is itself associated with "poetic performances" in other Virgilian poems, like in Eclogue 3.58. Finally, Floyd—who subscribes to the theory that cui non risere parentes is what Virgil wrote—proposed that line 62 refers to a boy whose parents will smile, only "after due consideration", meaning that the child must earn its parents' smiles. Floyd goes on to argue that it makes sense for the parents to either be Virgil or the Muses, individuals whose smiles must be earned; the Muses are critical of those whom they inspire, whereas Virgil—as a meticulous artist—was critical of himself.

Line 22, which mentions that "the cattle will not fear huge lions", has been compared to both Isaiah 11:6 from the Hebrew Bible, which states that, "The calf and the young lion will grow up together and a little child will lead them", as well as a passage from the Sibylline Oracles 3.791-3, which reads: "The lion, devourer of flesh, will eat husks in the stall like an ox, and tiny children will lead them in chains." Rose proposed that, because Virgil was highly educated and had "a great taste for philosophic and quasi-philosophic studies", it is possible that he combined dozens of mystical and religious ideas in the poem, "joining Sibylline formulae to age-old beliefs about divine kings, taking hints from many doctrines of original sin … with astrological speculations of recent date, and coloring the whole with the theanthropic, or Messianic, expectations." Due to this synthesis of ideas, Rose points out that it is possible that Virgil used the Hebrew Scriptures for part of the poem's inspiration. Cyrus H. Gordon later noted that the Eclogues, along with the Aeneid "reflect Egyptian, Semitic, and Anatolian, as well as Greek, antecedents".

Nisbet pointed out that the poem can be analyzed according to two different schools of thought: the "Easterners" (promoted notably by Eduard Norden) argue that the eclogue had to have been influenced by religions of the East, most notably Jewish messianism, whereas the "Westerners" (furthered by the work of Günther Jachmann) argue that the work was influenced largely by concepts familiar to the Greco-Roman West. Nisbet outlined reasons why certain sections, most notably the seemingly Isaian section in and around line 22, are best explained through the Easterners' method of interpretation. Other sections, however, such as lines 26–36—which Nisbet argued were written in a style akin to Greco-Roman prophecies (and whose wording suggests "the ideals of Virgil's own society")—should be viewed through the Westerners' lens. Ultimately, Nisbet concluded that Virgil was not interested in Jewish eschatology "for its own sake"; however, he probably appropriated elements from Jewish prophecy via Eastern oracles, and adapted them towards Western (which is to say, Roman) modes of thought.

Textual criticism

Clausen argued that the poem, were one to remove lines 1–3 and 58–9, would read much like an epithalamium, or a poem written specifically for a bride on the way to her marital chamber. However, the addition of the aforementioned lines changes the sense of the poem, making it pastoral. Thus, Clausen claims that Virgil himself added these new lines to tweak the poem and make it suitable for inclusion in the Eclogues.

In certain versions of the manuscript, the latter part of line 62 reads cui non risere parentes, meaning "[the child] at whom parents have not smiled". Some Virgilian scholars argue that the text should read, qui non risere parenti, meaning "[those who] have not smiled at their parent". This is largely because Roman rhetorician Quintilian noted in his writings that Virgil's text did in fact alternate between plural and singular forms, although he did not elaborate on which word was plural, and which was singular; some Virgilian scholars suggest that the emended word qui and parentes are the plural forms Quintilian was referring to, whereas the word hunc in line 63 is the singular form. However, Quintilian's text is the same as the supposedly "corrupt" Virgilian version, containing both cui and parentes. Certain scholars argue that Quintilian's original text was at one point changed to rectify it with Virgil's text, which had at that time also become corrupt. Edwin Floyd, however, rejects this hypothesis, reasoning that the argument is far too convoluted to be reasonable. He posits that the qui non risere parenti emendation strains the syntax and feebly renders the sense of the poem, as it merely speaks of a baby that is not smiling. The cui non risere parentes variation, according to Floyd, is to be preferred because it questions "what sort of 'unnatural' parents these might be who would not smile on their child." Other commentators disagree with Floyd. Nisbet, for instance, writes, "It is clear from the structure and sense of the passage that the baby is doing the laughing and not the parents (that is to say, the cui of Virgil's manuscripts is impossible against the qui implied by Quintilian 9.3.8)." He instead contends that the baby not laughing at his parents is a hint to the reader that "the infant is out of the ordinary."

Later Christian interpretation

By the thirteenth and fourteenth centuries AD, Virgil had gained a reputation as a virtuous pagan, a term referring to pagans who were never evangelized and consequently during their lifetime had no opportunity to recognize Christ, but nevertheless led virtuous lives, so that it seemed objectionable to consider them damned. Eventually, some Christians sought to reconcile Virgil's works, especially the Eclogues, with the supposed Christianity present in them. For instance, during the Late Antiquity and beyond, many assumed that the puer referenced in the Fourth Eclogue was actually Jesus Christ. Many noted individuals, such as Constantine the Great, St. Augustine, Dante Alighieri and Alexander Pope believed in this interpretation of the eclogue.

References

Bibliography

External links

Full Latin text of Eclogue 4, courtesy of the Perseus Project.

1st-century BC works
Poetry by Virgil
Mark Antony
Octavia the Younger